Euthynnus affinis, the mackerel tuna, little tuna, wavyback skipjack tuna, kawakawa, or tongkol is a species of ray-finned bony fish in the family Scombridae, or mackerel family.  It belongs to the tribe Thunnini, better known as the tunas. This is an Indo-Pacific species which is found from the Red Sea to French Polynesia.

Euthynnus affinis formerly was known as Euthynnus yaito.

References

External links

affinis
Fish of Hawaii
Fish described in 1849